The Commonwealth Immigrants Act 1968 (c. 9) was an Act of the Parliament of the United Kingdom.

The Act
The Act amended the Commonwealth Immigrants Act 1962, further reducing rights of citizens of the Commonwealth of Nations countries (as of 2010, comprising approximately 1.9 billion people) to migrate to the UK. The Act barred the future right of entry previously enjoyed by Citizens of the United Kingdom and Colonies, to those born there or who had at least one parent or grandparent born there.

Impact
It was introduced amid concerns that up to 200,000 Kenyan Asians, fleeing that country's "Africanization" policy, would take up their right to reside in the UK. The bill went through parliament in three days, supported by the leadership of both the governing Labour and main opposition Conservative parties, though opposed by some Labour backbenchers, a few Conservatives such as Iain Macleod and Michael Heseltine, and the small parliamentary Liberal Party.

Aftermath
In the wake of these subsequent reforms of the law on immigration from the Commonwealth to Britain, it became clear that the view of UK Government about immigration was changing.  As the states in the British Commonwealth achieved independence, and the idea of a British Empire ceased to be a reality, the Government decided that a more reserved, conservative approach to immigration was necessary. Hundreds of thousands of African, Asian, and Caribbean expectant immigrants arrived by other methods, including through Europe and by methods that did not involve them having immigration visas.  The 1968 Act was superseded by the Immigration Act 1971.

References

Category:Commonwealth immigration throughout the 20th century; bbc.co.uk/bitesize/guides 

1968 in law
United Kingdom Acts of Parliament 1968
Immigration law in the United Kingdom
1968 in international relations
Immigration legislation
United Kingdom and the Commonwealth of Nations